Egan Arley Bernal Gómez (born 13 January 1997) is a Colombian cyclist who rides for UCI WorldTeam . In 2019 he won the Tour de France, becoming the first Latin American rider to do so, and the youngest winner since 1909. At the 2021 Giro d'Italia, Bernal took his second Grand Tour win.

Early life
Bernal was born in Bogotá, Colombia, and raised in Zipaquirá. He is the oldest child of Germán, an employee at the Salt Cathedral, and Flor, a flower factory worker. His father had been a keen amateur cyclist, and he started riding on a second hand bicycle at age five. At nine, against his father's wishes, he entered and easily won a race in his home town, the prize for which included a training scholarship. He studied one semester at Universidad de la Sabana in Chia, Colombia.

He initially focused on and excelled at mountain biking, winning races in Brazil, Costa Rica, and the United States, and getting both silver (2014) and bronze (2015) in the UCI Mountain Bike World Championships junior cross country events.

Professional road racing
Alongside mountain biking, Bernal had begun to gain success in junior road racing both in Colombia and Italy, winning the Clasica Juventudes Cajica and the Sognando Il Giro delle Fiandre in 2015.

2016–2017
Bernal was signed by Gianni Savio to the  team on a four year contract, partly on the evidence of a VO2 max reading of 88.8ml/kg/min provided by his agent, Paolo Alberati. He began racing among seniors right away, bypassing the usual U23 career route. In 2016, he obtained top 20 results in the La Méditerranéenne, the GP Industria & Artigianato, Settimana Internazionale di Coppi e Bartali and Giro del Trentino, before winning the (then) lower level Tour of Bihor and coming fourth in both the Tour de Slovenie and the Tour de l'Avenir.

2017 saw top ten finishes for Bernal in the Vuelta a San Juan and the Tour de Langkawi. He later finished third overall in the Settimana Internazionale di Coppi e Bartali, second in the Giro dell'Appennino, and ninth in the Tour of the Alps. His first professional wins came in the Sibiu Cycling Tour, with two stage victories as well as the overall. He also won two stages and the overall title at the Tour de l'Avenir. He completed his time in Savio's team with fifth in the Giro della Toscana and top twenty places in Giro dell'Emilia, Milano–Torino and his first monument, Il Lombardia.

2018

In February 2018, Bernal won the Colombian National Time Trial Championships. He went on to win the first edition of the Tour Colombia (then called Colombia Oro y Paz), through an attack on the final  climb on the last day.

Bernal's next race was the Volta a Catalunya, in which he was second on general classification when he fell on a wet descent in the final stage, fracturing his clavicle and scapula.

The following month, Bernal competed in the Tour de Romandie, winning stage three of the race, an individual time trial and finishing second overall behind Primož Roglič. In May, Bernal achieved his first UCI World Tour win in the Tour of California, finishing over a minute ahead of Tejay van Garderen, and winning two stages.

In July, he rode the Tour de France as a domestique for team leaders Chris Froome and Geraint Thomas. He was the youngest participant in the race, and was still able to drop many contenders in the mountains.

2019

Bernal started his 2019 season in Colombia. He rode in the national championships and in his home stage race, the Tour Colombia. Bernal, however, was unable to defend his title in the race, finishing fourth overall. Bernal later went to Europe to compete in Paris–Nice. The Colombian impressed in the crosswinds, the individual time trial, and in the mountains, claiming the overall victory ahead of Nairo Quintana.

Bernal next finished third in the Volta a Catalunya, and was scheduled to lead Team Ineos at the Giro d'Italia until he broke a collarbone in a training injury in Andorra. He returned to racing for the Tour de Suisse, in which he won the overall classification and the queen stage.

Tour de France victory
Bernal was elevated to be co-leader of the team with defending champion Thomas for the Tour de France, because of the absence through injury of Froome. After the stage 2 team time trial he had a top ten position in the general classification, which he retained, despite an unimpressive individual time trial performance, into the three decisive alpine stages. An attack on the last climb of stage 18 saw him move into second place overall, ahead of Thomas, and he took the yellow jersey as race leader on stage 19 after an attack on the Col de l'Iseran. The stage was shortened because of landslides and a severe hail storm with 38 km remaining. Although the stage positions were considered null, times were taken at the top of the Iseran, putting Bernal in the lead with margins of forty five seconds over previous leader Julian Alaphilippe and one minute and eleven seconds over Thomas. He defended his lead on stage 20, another mountain stage, and confirmed his victory with the largely ceremonial ride onto the Champs-Élysées in Paris.

He thus became the first Colombian or South American rider, and second from the Americas, to win the Tour de France, and also won the best young rider competition. At the time he was the youngest General Classification winner since 1909 and the third youngest ever at 22 years, 196 days.
"It's incredible, I don’t know what to say", Bernal said. "I’ve won the Tour but I don’t manage to believe it. I need a couple of days to assimilate all this. It's for my family and I just want to hug them. It's a feeling of happiness that I don’t know how to describe it."
The young champion cyclist went on to say the victory was also for his home country of Colombia.
"This is not only my triumph", Bernal said. "It's the triumph of a whole country."

2020

In early 2020, Bernal finished fourth at the Tour Colombia. After the coronavirus break, he won the Route d'Occitanie, and finished second at the Tour de l'Ain. At the Colombian Road Race Championships, he claimed podiums in both the road race and time trial.

At the Tour de France, Bernal was in the top ten of the general classification from stage 2 to stage 14, and led the young rider classification for  five stages, but having been 59 seconds behind the leader after stage 14 he lost considerable time on the next two days, after which he withdrew from the race with back pain.

2021

After some early season stage races, including the Tour de la Provence where he took third place, he finished third in Strade Bianche, and in the Tirreno–Adriatico he managed one top five stage finish, and finished in fourth place, 4'13" behind winner Tadej Pogačar.

Bernal entered the 2021 Giro d'Italia as one of the favourites for the race. On the sixth stage to San Giacomo, Bernal put time into his rivals by finishing second behind stage winner Gino Mäder and moving into third place in the overall standings, 16 seconds behind new leader Attila Valter. On the race's ninth stage, Bernal took the first Grand Tour stage win of his career as well as the pink jersey with an attack on the gravel section at the end of the final climb to Campo Felice, emerging with a 15 second lead in the general classification over Remco Evenepoel. Bernal extended his lead on the second stage of the race with gravel sectors, stage 11 to Montalcino, where several of his general classification rivals lost time, including Evenepoel, giving Bernal a 45 second lead over Aleksander Vlasov. He took more time out of his rivals on stage 14, latching onto an attack by Simon Yates on the final climb up Monte Zoncolan before overhauling him to finish the stage in fourth and take a lead of over one and a half minutes in the general classification over Yates, who moved into the runner-up position. Bernal took his second stage win of the race on the sixteenth stage to Cortina d'Ampezzo, which was shortened due to poor weather, crossing the finish line 27 seconds in front of Romain Bardet and Damiano Caruso and opening up a lead in the overall standings of almost two and a half minutes over the latter going into the second rest day.

On the race's final week Bernal maintained his lead over Caruso but lost time to Yates, with the latter and João Almeida distancing Bernal on stage 17's finishing climb to Sega di Ala, cutting the gap between Bernal and Yates by almost a minute, and Yates again attacking on stage 19's final ascent up Alpe di Mera with about six and a half kilometres to go, going on to win the stage with Bernal almost half a minute behind. On the final mountain stage, Caruso and his teammate Pello Bilbao distanced Bernal on the descent of the San Bernardino Pass 50 km from the finish in pursuit of a group of riders from  including Bardet before working with riders from an earlier breakaway to extend their lead over Bernal to 50 seconds up the penultimate climb of the Splügen Pass. Bernal and his teammates were able to reduce the gap to less than half a minute by the time Caruso crossed the finish line on the Alpe Motta to win the stage, reducing Bernal's general classification lead to just under two minutes. Bernal secured the pink jersey on the final time trial in Milan, conceding another 30 seconds to Caruso to win by a one and a half minute margin. He became the fourth rider to win both the Tour and the Giro before reaching the age of 25, after Gino Bartali, Felice Gimondi and Eddy Merckx, and also the fourth rider to win both the overall and youth classifications in the same Giro, alongside Evgeni Berzin, countryman Nairo Quintana and teammate Tao Geoghegan Hart.

Bernal entered the 2021 Vuelta a España with a very strong team that also included Richard Carapaz and Adam Yates. By his own standards he rode poorly early in the race and was not happy with his own performance. Despite this his took over the young rider classification after stage 3 and was in a top 10 position among the general classification riders for most of the race. On stage 17 which included the climb to the Lagos de Covadonga he launched an attack with 61 kilometers to go. Primož Roglič was the only rider who could go with him and the two continuously built a gap over the other favorites. By the end of the stage he had fallen back and crossed the line with the surviving general classification riders still maintaining his lead over Gino Mäder in the young rider competition and rising to 6th place overall. On the penultimate climb of the race he got caught out in a split among the GC riders and lost the young rider jersey to Mäder, but retained his 6th place after the final ITT on stage 21.

2022

Bernal was on his time-trial bike and had not been attentive to the stopped bus according to the transit police. Ineos team later released a statement stating Bernal had sustained "[...]a fractured vertebrae, a fractured right femur, a fractured right patella, chest trauma, a punctured lung and several rib fractures". Bernal was taken to Clinica Universidad de La Sabana in Bogotá for treatment. In total, doctors counted 20 separate fractures and initially warned there was a 95% chance Bernal would die or be paralyzed. He underwent two surgeries, both of which were successful in the immediate sense; the long term impacts are less certain. By 25 January he was stabilized, although still in intensive care as the doctors moved to treating less serious injuries.

Fortunately he began to recover quickly, and by early March was sharing his progress with friends, family and fans on social media. His coach, Xabier Artexte, did not rule out a return to cycling by the end of the 2022 season.

There was a rumor that Bernal would possibly make his return at the 2022 Vuelta a España, however Vuelta Director Javier Guillén stated this was not true. Instead Bernal is intending to ride in the 2022 edition of Vuelta a Burgos. The plan was changed again with his new return being the Danmark Rundt.

Major results

Road

2016
 1st  Overall Tour of Bihor
1st  Young rider classification
1st Stage 1
 1st  Young rider classification, Settimana Internazionale di Coppi e Bartali
 1st  Young rider classification, Giro del Trentino
 4th Overall Tour of Slovenia
1st  Young rider classification
 4th Overall Tour de l'Avenir
2017
 1st  Overall Sibiu Cycling Tour
1st  Points classification
1st  Young rider classification
1st Stages 2 & 3
 1st  Overall Tour de Savoie Mont Blanc
1st  Points classification
1st  Young rider classification
1st Stages 2 & 4 (ITT)
 1st  Overall Tour de l'Avenir
1st Stages 7 & 8
 2nd Giro dell'Appennino
 3rd Memorial Marco Pantani
 4th Overall Settimana Internazionale di Coppi e Bartali
1st  Young rider classification
 5th Overall Giro della Toscana
1st  Young rider classification
 5th GP Industria & Artigianato di Larciano
 7th Overall Tour de Langkawi
 9th Overall Tour of the Alps
1st  Young rider classification
 9th Overall Vuelta a San Juan
1st  Young rider classification
2018
 1st  Time trial, National Championships
 1st  Overall Tour of California
1st  Young rider classification
1st Stages 2 & 6
 1st  Overall Colombia Oro y Paz
1st  Mountains classification
1st  Young rider classification
 2nd Overall Tour de Romandie
1st  Young rider classification
1st Stage 3 (ITT) 
 6th Overall Tour Down Under
1st  Young rider classification
 10th Milano–Torino
2019
 1st  Overall Tour de France
1st  Young rider classification
 1st  Overall Tour de Suisse
1st  Young rider classification
1st Stage 7
 1st  Overall Paris–Nice
1st  Young rider classification
 1st Gran Piemonte
 2nd Giro della Toscana
 3rd Overall Volta a Catalunya
 3rd Time trial, National Championships
 3rd Giro di Lombardia
 4th Overall Tour Colombia
 6th Milano–Torino
 9th Giro dell'Emilia
2020
 1st  Overall Route d'Occitanie
1st  Points classification
1st  Young rider classification
1st Stage 3
 National Championships
2nd Road race
3rd Time trial
 2nd Overall Tour de l'Ain
 4th Overall Tour Colombia
 Tour de France
Held  after Stages 7–12
2021
 1st  Overall Giro d'Italia
1st  Young rider classification
1st Stages 9 & 16
 2nd Trofeo Laigueglia
 3rd Overall Tour de la Provence
 3rd Strade Bianche
 4th Overall Tirreno–Adriatico
 6th Overall Vuelta a España
Held  after Stages 3–19
 Combativity award Stage 17

General classification results timeline

Mountain Bike

2014
 2nd  Cross-country, UCI World Junior Championships
 3rd  Cross-country, Pan-American Junior Championships
2015
 1st  Cross-country, Pan-American Junior Championships
 3rd  Cross-country, UCI World Junior Championships

Notes

References

External links

Egan Bernal at FirstCycling

1997 births
Colombian Giro d'Italia stage winners
Colombian male cyclists
Giro d'Italia winners
Living people
Sportspeople from Bogotá
People from Zipaquirá
Tour de France winners
Tour de Suisse stage winners
21st-century Colombian people